A frosting spatula or palette knife is a kitchen utensil designed especially for the use of spreading a substance onto a flat surface, such as frosting on a cake. It is also an ideal tool for applying spreads onto sandwiches in mass quantities.

The term 'palette knife' is common outside the US, where the term 'frosting' is not generally used. However a palette knife as a culinary tool is not the same as a palette knife as used by artists. In Canada, the terms metal spatula and leveler are also used.

The English television cook Delia Smith refers to the joys of owning a "palette knife with a serrated edge", such that it provides ease of slicing cake as well as the spreading of icing (frosting) upon them. 

The traditionally accepted British source "Mrs Beeton's Book of Household Management" however refers only to the use of a "broad knife" for laying on icing (frosting).

Food preparation utensils